The Youngstown Hardhats were a semi-professional football team that played from 1972 to 1974 and 1976 to 1981. The team was based in Youngstown, Ohio, and competed in the Midwest Football League from 1972 to 1974 and 1976, and Mid-Atlantic Football League from 1977 to 1981.

History

Midwest Football League
In January 1972, owner Ralph Erskine announced George Rodak as the head coach for the Hardhats. They played their home games at Struthers High School in 1972. The team held open tryouts in June 1972, with former Duke linebacker Dick Biddle in attendance. They played against the Washington Bears in an exhibition game on July 1, 1972, and against the Madison Mustangs of the Central States Football League on July 22. The Cleveland Browns of the National Football League sent six contracted players to the Hardhats for their August 5 game against the Lansing All Stars. After posting an 8–2 regular season record in 1972, the Hardhats were defeated in the league championship game by the Indiana Caps. They went 8–2 again in 1973 under head coach Bill Shunkwiler. Al Boggia was named head coach of the Hardhats in May 1974. The team went 5–4 in 1974, finishing second in the Lakes Division.

The Hardhats posted a 38–6 record over three seasons. Despite this record, the Hardhats' owners announced in March 1975 that they would not field a team for the upcoming season, because of declining attendance and reports that a team from the World Football League would locate in Akron, Ohio. The Hardhats returned for the 1976 season, and posted another 8–2 record.

Mid-Atlantic Football League
Youngstown joined the Mid-Atlantic Football League in 1977, and, after, posting a 9–2 record in the regular season, lost in the championship game. They were considered the ninth-best semi-pro team in the country in 1977. They remained in the league for the 1978 season, competing in the South High School stadium in Youngstown and coached again by Boggia. During the 1979 season, the Hardhats were considered ninth in the country for minor league football teams. They played in the Mid-Atlantic Football League again in 1980 and 1981. The team folded during the 1981 season.

Season-by-season

Notable players
Quentin Lowry
Lou Piccone

References

Defunct American football teams in Ohio
Sports in Youngstown, Ohio
American football teams established in 1972
American football teams disestablished in 1981
1972 establishments in Ohio
1981 disestablishments in Ohio
Semi-professional American football
Midwest Football League (1962–1978) teams